Irene Shin (born October 7, 1987) is an American politician and non-profit executive who has served as the delegate of the Virginia House of Delegates for the 86th district since January 2022. A Democrat, she defeated incumbent Ibraheem Samirah in the Democratic primary in 2021.

Early life and education
The daughter of Korean immigrants, she was born in Glendale, California and raised in Greater Los Angeles. She received a Bachelor of Arts degree in political science from the University of California, Riverside in 2010.

Career
Shin has worked on various Democratic political campaigns, including as finance director for then-Senator Kamala Harris. She is the executive director of non-profit Virginia Civic Engagement Table. Shin serves on the Tysons Transportation District Service Advisory Board for Fairfax County.

Virginia House of Delegates

2021 election

She announced a primary campaign against Delegate Ibraheem Samirah for District 86 in 2021. Despite challenging an incumbent Democrat, Shin received support from the Virginia Democratic Party establishment including multiple state legislators. She defeated Samirah in the June primary by 230 votes and out-raised him by over $100,000.

She defeated Republican Julie Perry in the general election by a margin of 65–34%.

Electoral history

Personal life
She moved to Virginia in 2014 and lives in Herndon.

References

University of California, Riverside alumni
Living people
Asian-American people in Virginia politics
Democratic Party members of the Virginia House of Delegates
Women state legislators in Virginia
American politicians of Korean descent
American women of Korean descent in politics
Year of birth missing (living people)
People from Herndon, Virginia
People from Glendale, California